The United Democratic Party is a political party in the Solomon Islands.

History 
The party won 7 seats in the 2014 general election.

Members of Parliament 

 Jimson Tanangada
 Danny Philip
 Clezy Rore
 John Moffat Fugui
 Makario Tagini

Electoral history

References 

Political parties in the Solomon Islands
2010s establishments in the Solomon Islands